The 2011 FIFA Ballon d'Or Gala was the second year for FIFA's awards for the top football players and coaches of the year. The awards were given out in Zürich on 9 January 2012, with Lionel Messi claiming the title of world player of the year for the third time in a row.

The gala ceremony was hosted by former Ballon d'Or winner Ruud Gullit and broadcast journalist Kay Murray of Real Madrid TV and Fox Soccer Channel, with singer-songwriter James Blunt and his band providing musical entertainment.

Winners and nominees

FIFA Ballon d'Or 
The top three nominees for the 2011 FIFA Ballon d'Or were:

The following 20 men were also in contention for the FIFA Ballon d’Or 2011:

FIFA Women's World Player of the Year
The top three nominees for the 2011 FIFA Women's World Player of the Year were:

The following seven women were also in contention for the 2011 FIFA Women's World Player of the Year:

FIFA World Coach of the Year for Men's Football

FIFA World Coach of the Year for Women's Football

FIFA/FIFPro World XI

FIFA Puskás Award

FIFA Presidential Award 
 Sir Alex Ferguson

FIFA Fair Play Award 
 Japan Football Association

Controversy
The day after the awards ceremony, Spanish newspaper Marca reported that none of the four captains of the Spanish women's national team had voted for the Women's World Player of the Year award. According to the list of votes published by FIFA, captain Sandra Vilanova had awarded five points to Hope Solo, three to Louisa Nécib and one to Marta.

References

External links 
France Football Official Ballon d'Or page
2011 FIFA Ballon d'Or at "FIFA.com"

2011
Fifa Ballon Dor, 2011
Basel
2011 sports awards
2011 in women's association football
Women's association football trophies and awards